The  is a square in Paris, France.

Before the liberation of Paris, the square was called the Place du Combat, but it was renamed in honour of the French communist resistance hero Pierre Georges, whose nom de guerre was Colonel Fabien.

The headquarters of the French Communist Party, designed by the Brazilian communist and utilitarian architect Oscar Niemeyer, is located here, as is a station of the Paris Métro. Nearby is the former location of the medieval Gibbet of Montfaucon, a multi-tiered gibbet that was for most of its history outside the city walls of Paris.

External links
Panoramic view
Satellite image from Google Maps

Colonel Fabien
French Communist Party
10th arrondissement of Paris
19th arrondissement of Paris